The Proto-Khmeric language is the reconstructed proto-language of the Khmeric languages. It has been reconstructed by Sidwell & Rau (2015), whose reconstruction is based on the sound laws provided in Ferlus (1992). It is agreed by most scholars that this language was phased out by 300 CE.

Reconstructed forms
The reconstructed Proto-Khmeric forms below are from Sidwell & Rau (2015: 273, 340-363).

Lexical innovations
Selected Khmeric lexical innovations:

See also
Proto-Austroasiatic language

References

Ferlus, Michel. 1992. Essai de phonétique historique du khmer (Du milieu du premier millénaire de notre ère à l'époque actuelle). Mon-Khmer Studies 21: 57–89.
Sidwell, Paul and Felix Rau (2015). "Austroasiatic Comparative-Historical Reconstruction: An Overview." In Jenny, Mathias and Paul Sidwell, eds (2015). The Handbook of Austroasiatic Languages. Leiden: Brill.

Khmer language
Khmeric